2-phospho-L-lactate transferase (LPPG:Fo 2-phospho-L-lactate transferase, LPPG:7,8-didemethyl-8-hydroxy-5-deazariboflavin 2-phospho-L-lactate transferase, MJ1256, lactyl-2-diphospho-(5')guanosine:Fo 2-phospho-L-lactate transferase, CofD) is an enzyme with systematic name (2S)-lactyl-2-diphospho-5'-guanosine:7,8-didemethyl-8-hydroxy-5-deazariboflavin 2-phospho-L-lactate transferase. This enzyme catalyses the following chemical reaction

 (2S)-lactyl-2-diphospho-5'-guanosine + 7,8-didemethyl-8-hydroxy-5-deazariboflavin  GMP + coenzyme F420-0

This enzyme is involved in the biosynthesis of coenzyme F420.

References

External links 
 

EC 2.7.8